On June 4, 1816, after being defeated for re-election, Enos T. Throop (DR) of  resigned his seat.  A special election was held in September of that year to fill the vacancy left for the remainder of the 14th Congress

Election results

Avery assumed his seat December 3

See also
List of special elections to the United States House of Representatives

References

New York 1816 20
1816 20
New York 1816 20
New York 20
United States House of Representatives 20
United States House of Representatives 1816 20